John Ware (19 December 1795, Hingham, Massachusetts – 29 April 1864, Boston, Massachusetts) was an American physician and fellow of the American Academy of Arts and Sciences.

Biography
John Ware graduated from Harvard College in 1813. He then began the study of medicine at Harvard Medical School, where he graduated with M.D. in 1816. Immediately upon graduation, he began to practice medicine in Duxbury, but in 1817 he moved to Boston, where he resided until his death in 1864. In 1832 he was appointed Professor in the Theory and Practice of Medicine in Harvard College's Medical Department and held the professorship until 1858. His predecessor in the professorship was James Jackson. In 1828 Ware was one of the editors of the New England Journal of Medicine. In 1828 he also became the first editor of the Boston Medical and Surgical Journal. He was one of the founding members in 1828 of the Boston Society for Medical Improvement and one of the founding members in 1830 of the Boston Society of Natural History.

In 1823 he was elected a fellow of the American Academy of Arts and Sciences.

Family
The second son of the Unitarian theologian Henry Ware, John Ware married Helen Lincoln (1798–1858) in 1822. Her father Levi was a physician and a fifth cousin of Abraham Lincoln. John and Helen Ware had three daughters and two sons. Their first son died in infancy.

Selected publications

References

External links
 

1795 births
1864 deaths
19th-century American physicians
Harvard College alumni
Harvard Medical School alumni
Harvard Medical School faculty
Fellows of the American Academy of Arts and Sciences